Windigsteig is a municipality in the district of Waidhofen an der Thaya in the Austrian state of Lower Austria.

Geography 
Windigsteig lies in the northern Waldviertel in Lower Austria. The market municipality covers an area of 25.49 square kilometres, 21.57% of which is wooded.

Municipal subdivisions 

The municipality includes the following 13 villages (in brackets is their population as at 1 January 2015):

 Edengans (19)
 Grünau (31)
 Kleinreichenbach (72)
 Kottschallings (66)
 Lichtenberg (60)
 Markl (112)
 Matzlesschlag (48)
 Meires (60)
 Rafings (82)
 Rafingsberg (17)
 Waldberg (49)
 Willings (41)
 Windigsteig (312)

The Cadastral municipalities are Edengans, Grünau, Kleinreichenbach, Kottschallings, Lichtenberg, Markl, Matzlesschlag, Meires, Rafings, Waldberg, Willings and Windigsteig.

Population

References

External links 

Cities and towns in Waidhofen an der Thaya District